Kåre Aasgaard (born 2 November 1933) is a Norwegian footballer. He played in one match for the Norway national football team in 1960.

References

External links
 

1933 births
Living people
Norwegian footballers
Norway international footballers
Sportspeople from Drammen
Association football goalkeepers